Armageddon, Mon Amour is the second album by the Swedish melodic death metal band Hearse.

Track listing

 "Armaggedon, mon amour" is French for "Armageddon, my love" which was taken from an actual film title, except changed the first word.

References

2004 albums
Hearse (band) albums